Warrior Nun is an American fantasy drama streaming television series created by Simon Barry based on the comic book character Warrior Nun Areala by Ben Dunn.

Developed as a feature film adaptation, the idea was re-imagined as a television series for Netflix when the service had given the production a series order for a first season. Filming takes place in multiple locations in Andalusia, Spain, such as Antequera, where the headquarters of the fictional Order of the Cruciform Sword was filmed.

The series is narrated and led by Portuguese actress Alba Baptista in the role of Ava Silva, a quadriplegic orphan who discovers she now has supernatural powers which force her to join an ancient order of warrior nuns. The series marks Baptista's English-language debut. The cast also features Toya Turner, Thekla Reuten, Lorena Andrea, Kristina Tonteri-Young, Sylvia De Fanti and Tristán Ulloa.

The series debuted on July 2, 2020, to generally positive reviews. In August 2020, the series was renewed for a second season, which was released on November 10, 2022.

The series was canceled on December 13, 2022 after two seasons. The cancellation resulted in a surge of fan protests including a petition with over hundred-thousand signatures.

Premise
Warrior Nun revolves around the story of a 19-year-old woman who wakes up in a morgue with a new lease on life and a divine artifact embedded in her back. She discovers she is now part of the ancient Order of the Cruciform Sword that has been tasked with fighting demons on Earth, and powerful forces representing both heaven and hell want to find and control her.

Cast and characters

Main

 Alba Baptista as Ava Silva
 Isabella Tabares portrays a young Ava (guest season 1)
 Toya Turner as Sister Mary / Shotgun Mary 
 Lorena Andrea as Sister Lilith
 Kristina Tonteri-Young as Sister Beatrice
 Tristán Ulloa as Father Vincent
 Olivia Delcán as Sister Camila
 Thekla Reuten as Jillian Salvius
 Sylvia De Fanti as Mother Superion (season 2; recurring season 1)
 Isabel M. Hernanz portrays a young Mother Superion (guest season 2)
 William Miller as Adriel (season 2; recurring season 1)

Recurring

 Emilio Sakraya as JC (season 1)
 May Simón Lifschitz as Chanel (season 1)
 Charlotte Vega as Zori (season 1)
 Dimitri Abold as Randall (season 1)
 Peter de Jersey as Kristian Schaefer
 Joaquim de Almeida as Cardinal / Pope Francisco Duretti
 Lope Haydn Evans as young Michael Salvius (season 1)
 Jack Mullarkey as adult Michael Salvius / Miguel (season 2)
 Meena Rayann as Yasmine Amunet (season 2)
 Richard Clothier as Cardinal William Foster (season 2)
 Sadiqua Binum as Sister Dora (season 2)

Guest
 Melina Matthews as Sister Shannon Masters
 Fred Pritchard as Diego (season 1)
 Frances Tomelty as Sister Frances (season 1)
 Guiomar Alonso as Areala de Cordoue
 Alberto Ruano as Mateo (season 1)
 Sinead MacInnes as Sister Crimson (season 1)
 Oscar Foronda as Crusader Knight (season 1)
 Julius Cotter a Justin, Archbishop of Canterbury (season 2)
 Christian Stamm as Cardinal Gunter (season 2)
 Miquel Ripeu as Cardinal Rossi (season 2)
 Andrea Tivadar as Reya (season 2)

Episodes

Series overview

Season 1 (2020)

Season 2 (2022)

Production

Development

On September 28, 2018, it was announced that Netflix had given the production a series order for a first season consisting of ten episodes. Simon Barry was set to serve as showrunner for the series. Barry is also credited as an executive producer alongside Stephen Hegyes with Terri Hughes Burton serving as a co-executive producer for the series. Production companies involved with the series are Barry's Reality Distortion Field and Fresco Film Services. The series premiered on July 2, 2020. On August 19, 2020, Netflix renewed the series for a second season. On December 13, 2022, it has been announced that the series has been canceled after two seasons.

Casting
Sometime after the series order announcement, it was confirmed that Alba Baptista, Toya Turner, Tristan Ulloa, Thekla Reuten, Kristina Tonteri-Young, Lorena Andrea, and Emilio Sakraya would star in the series. On April 1, 2019, it was announced that Sylvia De Fanti had joined the cast as a series regular. On October 18, 2021, Meena Rayann, Jack Mullarkey and Richard Clothier joined the cast as recurring roles for the second season.

Filming
Filming for the first season took place on location of Andalusia (Spain), in the town of Antequera (where the headquarters of the Order of the Cruciform Sword is located) Marbella, Ronda, Málaga, and Sevilla, from March 11, 2019 to July 5, 2019. The El Tajo Gorge was featured in one of the scenes. Pre-production for the second season began in late May 2021 and filming began in late July 2021 in Madrid, Spain. Production for the second season wrapped up on November 4 in Spain.

Release
On June 17, 2020, Netflix released the official trailer for the series, and the first season was released on July 2, 2020. The second season was released on November 10, 2022.

Reception
On Rotten Tomatoes, season 1 has an approval rating of 68% based on 34 critic reviews,  with an average rating of 6.5/10. The website's critics consensus reads, "Though Warrior Nun heavy handed set-up weighs it down, committed performances and excellent fight choreography may be enough for those looking for more pulp with their pulpit." On Rotten Tomatoes, season 2 has an approval rating of 100% based on reviews from 11 critics. On Metacritic, the show has a weighted average score of 62 out of 100, based on reviews from 7 critics, indicating "generally favorable reviews".

Roxana Hadadi of The A.V. Club wrote: "The script can sometimes lean too much on mythological and religious exposition... but the actors have such good chemistry that their various pairings work, and the smartly choreographed fight scenes are well-placed." Hadadi said that "Warrior Nun is undoubtedly familiar" influenced by the likes of Veronica Mars, Buffy the Vampire Slayer, and Alex Garland's Devs, but that when the show really clicks it becomes "its own distinct experience rather than simply a derivative facsimile of those inspirations." She praised the performances, particularly Toya Turner as Shotgun Mary, and gives the show a grade B−. Nicole Drum of ComicBook.com gave the review 3 out of 5, and wrote: "Warrior Nun is a truly wild journey that manages to ask some tough questions while equally embracing its silliness, its action, and the absolute absurdity of it all. The show may not be everyone's cup of tea, but it is one hell of a fun ride."

While the majority of critics praised the choreography of the series, some took issue with the pacing of the plot and the extensive exposition of the plot. Robyn Bahr, of The Hollywood Reporter notes, "Thematically, Warrior Nun is nothing you haven't seen before, and aesthetically, nothing you ever want to see again... Bleak, dour and trudging, the series contains none of the kitschy, blasphemous fun of its title." Critic Steve Murray notes that Warrior Nun has "both potential and problems in equal measure"; supposing that the series is trying to recreate the feel of Buffy the Vampire Slayer but with less witty dialogue and creativity.

Reviewing season 2, Paul Tassi of Forbes wrote: "The series has brutal, surprisingly great action, a meaningful central romance and unexpectedly biting commentary on religion."

Cancellation and response 
On December 13, 2022, creator Simon Barry revealed on Twitter that Netflix would not be renewing Warrior Nun for a third season, thanking the fans for the love showed to the cast and production team.  Fans responded on social media, with many seeing the decision as part of a trend of discontinuing female-led shows with queer representation, known colloquially as the trope "Cancel Your Gays".  Within days a grass roots fan-led campaign began to advocate for the reversal of the cancellation and renewal of the show, or for Netflix to sell the rights of the show to another streaming platform. A fan created petition on Change.Org was set up in response to the cancellation by Netflix and as of January 15, 2023, has gained over hundred-thousand signatures.

Paul Tassi of Forbes wrote: "Netflix Cancels ‘Warrior Nun,’ Its Highest Audience-Scored Series Ever, For Reasons". Tassi pointed out that "Warrior Nun is a unique case in that Season 2 is the singular best-scored season of a show in Netflix history, according to Rotten Tomatoes metrics."  Mike Bedard of Looper.com suggested that "there are very good reasons why other streamers would be wise to give "Warrior Nun" another shot."  In response to the fan-led campaign to bring the show back, Bedard said "For another streamer to pick it up would be a no-brainer. It would be an instant way to build up some good karma amongst fans and could even lead to new subscribers, which is what all these platforms need to finally turn a profit."

References

External links
 
 

2020s American drama television series
2020s American supernatural television series
2020 American television series debuts
2022 American television series endings
American fantasy drama television series
American action television series
Dark fantasy television series
Martial arts television series
Angels in television
Demons in television
Television series about nuns
English-language Netflix original programming
Television shows based on comics
Television series about orphans
Television about magic
Television shows filmed in Spain
Television shows set in Spain
Television shows set in Andalusia
Television shows set in Vatican City
Television shows about Catholicism
Málaga in fiction